Jeffrey K. Uhlmann is an American research scientist who is probably best known for his mathematical generalizations of the Kalman filter. Most of his publications and patents have been in the field of data fusion. He is also known for being a cult filmmaker and former recording artist.

Uhlmann has also began a career in YouTube under the anonymous persona uhlmannj with two feature videos: Man With No Hat, and The Glass. Both videos have gained hundreds of views.

Biography
Uhlmann has degrees in philosophy, computer science, and a doctorate in robotics from the University of Oxford. He began work in 1987 at NRL's Laboratory for Computational Physics and Fluid Dynamics in Washington, DC, and remained at NRL until 2000. Since 2000 he has been a professor of computer science at the University of Missouri.

He served for ten years as a co-founding member of the editorial board of the ACM Journal of Experimental Algorithmics (1995–2006) before becoming co-editor of the Synthesis Lectures on Quantum Computing series for Morgan & Claypool.

Theoretical Research
Uhlmann published seminal papers on volumetric, spatial, and metric tree data structures and their applications for computer graphics, virtual reality, and multiple-target tracking. He originated the unscented transform (and its use in the unscented Kalman filter) and the data fusion techniques of covariance intersection and covariance union.

Applied Results
Uhlmann's results are widely-applied in tracking, navigation, and control systems, including for the NASA Mars rover program. His results relating to the constrained shortest path problem and simultaneous localization and mapping are also used in rover and autonomous vehicle applications.

Films 
Uhlmann has written, directed, produced, and/or acted in several prominent short and feature-length films. Notable examples include the animated short film Susan's Big Day and the feature films Mil Mascaras vs. the Aztec Mummy, Academy of Doom, and Aztec Revenge. In recent years he has been a popular invited guest at international genre film festivals.

Music
Uhlmann recorded and released a series of albums in the 1970s and 1980s. Some of his early experimental electronic albums have been reissued in their entirety on CD or digital download while his arguably better-known songs are only available on CD compilations.

References

External links
 Research page
 Synthesis Lectures on Quantum Computing
 

American roboticists
American computer scientists
21st-century American engineers
Ambient musicians
American electronic musicians
American experimental musicians
American film directors
American film producers
American male film actors
American male screenwriters
Living people
Year of birth missing (living people)
21st-century American screenwriters
21st-century American male writers